The  Ministry of Housing and Public Works (Gr̥hāẏana ō gaṇapūrta mantraṇālaẏa) is a ministry of the government of the People's Republic of Bangladesh which provides housing and regulates the state construction activities in the country.

Directorate
Public Works Department (PWD)
Urban Development Directorate (UDD)
Housing and Building Research Institute (HBRI)
Department of Architecture
 Directorate of Internal Audit
Directorate of Government Accommodation
National Housing Authority NHA
Capital Development Authority (RAJUK)
Khulna Development Authority (KDA)
Rajshahi Development Authority (RDA)
 Cox's Bazar Development Authority 
Chittagong Development Authority ( CDA )
Barishal Development Authority

References

 
Housing and Public Works
Bangladesh
Bangladesh